Hanwell Cemetery may refer to one of the cemeteries in the town of Hanwell, all of which are near each other:

City of Westminster Cemetery, Hanwell, Ealing, 31 Uxbridge Road on the south side of the road, W7 3PP
Royal Borough of Kensington and Chelsea Cemetery, Hanwell, 38 Uxbridge Road on the north side of the road, W7 3PX
St. Mary's Church, Hanwell, on Church Road, W7 3BZ, the traditional graveyard for Hanwell